Tyndall (pronounced TIN'-duhl) is a city in and the county seat of Bon Homme County, South Dakota, United States. The population was 1,057 at the 2020 census.

History
Tyndall was established in 1879 as the county seat of Bon Homme County. It was named for John Tyndall, an Irish physicist who had paid a visit to the United States.

Geography
South Dakota Highway 50 serves the community and runs east–west on the southern end of town, and South Dakota Highway 37 is located just west of town.

Tyndall has been assigned the ZIP code 57066 and the FIPS place code 64860.

Climate

Demographics

2010 census
As of the census of 2010, there were 1,067 people, 471 households, and 268 families living in the city. The racial makeup of the city was 97.9% White, 0.1% African American, 0.7% Native American, 0.6% from other races, and 0.7% from two or more races. Hispanic or Latino of any race were 1.6% of the population.

There were 471 households, of which 23.8% had children under the age of 18 living with them, 46.3% were married couples living together, 7.9% had a female householder with no husband present, 2.8% had a male householder with no wife present, and 43.1% were non-families. 39.9% of all households were made up of individuals, and 22.5% had someone living alone who was 65 years of age or older. The average household size was 2.12 and the average family size was 2.88.

The median age in the city was 48.2 years. 21.5% of residents were under the age of 18; 4% were between the ages of 18 and 24; 18.7% were from 25 to 44; 27.5% were from 45 to 64; and 28.2% were 65 years of age or older. The gender makeup of the city was 47.7% male and 52.3% female.

2000 census
As of the census of 2000, there were 1,239 people, 524 households, and 311 families living in the city. The population density was 783.6 people per square mile (302.8/km2). There were 579 housing units at an average density of 366.2/sq mi (141.5/km2). The racial makeup of the city was 98.22% White, 0.56% African American, 0.56% Native American, 0.16% from other races, and 0.48% from two or more races. Hispanic or Latino of any race were 0.65% of the population.

There were 524 households, out of which 24.4% had children under the age of 18 living with them, 50.0% were married couples living together, 5.9% had a female householder with no husband present, and 40.5% were non-families. 36.8% of all households were made up of individuals, and 20.8% had someone living alone who was 65 years of age or older. The average household size was 2.22 and the average family size was 2.92.

In the city, the population was spread out, with 22.8% under the age of 18, 4.9% from 18 to 24, 23.1% from 25 to 44, 21.3% from 45 to 64, and 27.8% who were 65 years of age or older. The median age was 44 years. For every 100 females, there were 93.0 males. For every 100 females age 18 and over, there were 89.7 males.

As of 2000 the median income for a household in the city was $28,042, and the median income for a family was $37,500. Males had a median income of $24,219 versus $20,109 for females. The per capita income for the city was $15,086. About 9.6% of families and 17.2% of the population were below the poverty line, including 23.2% of those under age 18 and 21.8% of those age 65 or over.

Notable people
 Raleigh Aitchison - Professional baseball pitcher from 1911 to 1915
 Chuck Morrell - College football coach
 Josh Ranek - Canadian Football League player
 Robert Taplett - U.S. Marine Corps officer, recipient of the Navy Cross

See also
 List of cities in South Dakota

References

External links

 

Cities in Bon Homme County, South Dakota
Cities in South Dakota
County seats in South Dakota